Panes is one of eight parishes (administrative divisions) in Peñamellera Baja, a municipality within the province and autonomous community of Asturias, in northern Spain.

The population is 568 (INE 2011).

The Bowling Museum of Asturias is located in the parish.

Parishes in Peñamellera Baja